Novonikolayevka is a rural locality (a village) in Bakeyevsky Selsoviet, Sterlibashevsky District, Bashkortostan, Russia. The population was 71 as of 2010. There are 2 streets.

Geography 
Novonikolayevka is located 15 km southeast of Sterlibashevo (the district's administrative centre) by road. Bakeyevo is the nearest rural locality.

References 

Rural localities in Sterlibashevsky District